Bohdan Andrusyshyn (also Bahdan Andrusishyn, born January 3, 1958), also known under his stage name Danchyk, is a Belarusian journalist and former singer.

Biography

Andrusyshyn was born in New York City to a Ukrainian father and a Belarusian mother. In 1981 he graduated from the public communications faculty of the University of New York. At the same year, he had his first concert tour in Podlachia, eastern Poland, home to a large Belarusian minority.

In 1989, he for the first time visited Belarus and had several concerts there. His second tour to Belarus took place in 1996. Danchyk gained significant popularity, especially among Belarusian language speakers.

In 1997, Danchyk stopped his singing career and concentrated on working for the Belarusian edition of Radio Free Europe.

External links
 Годзе зьнявагі!
 Podcast: Danchyk, An American Idol -- In Belarus

Discography
 Беларусачка, Biełarusačka (Belarusian Girl), 1978
 Мы адной табе належым, My adnoj tabie naležym (It's Only You We Belong to, together with Lyavon Bartkevich), 1985
 Я ад вас далёка, Ja ad vas daloka (I Am Far From You), 1985, re-released in 2005
 Калядныя песьні, Kaladnyja pieśni (Christmas Songs), 1996

References

20th-century Belarusian male singers
Belarusian journalists
Radio Free Europe/Radio Liberty people
American people of Belarusian descent
American people of Ukrainian descent
1958 births
Living people
Belarusian LGBT singers
21st-century LGBT people